AN/SPQ-9A, (sometimes pronounced as "spook nine"), is a United States Navy multi-purpose surface search and fire control radar used with the Mk-86 gun fire-control system (MK86 GFCS). It is a two dimensional surface-search radar, meaning it provides only range and bearing but not elevation. It is intended primarily to detect and track targets at sea level, on the surface of the water for either gun fire engagement or navigation. It can however, also detect and track low altitude (below 2000 ft) air targets.

Service
It was fitted to the German Navy's s as part of the Type 103B upgrade in the 1980s.

SPQ-9B
The SPQ-9A is being replaced on all Ticonderoga-class cruisers and Arleigh Burke-class destroyers by the SPQ-9B, which provides twice the range and improved range resolution. This replacement is being done as a part of the United States Navy's Cruiser Modernization program to extend the life of the existing ships. The new SPQ-9B will be a part of the Mk 160 Mod 11 Gun Computer System of the Mk 34 Gun Weapon System. It is to be installed on CVN-68, LPD-17, CG-47, WMSL-750, LHD-1, and LHA-6 ship classes. The system is X-band and the antenna consists of dual planar arrays mounted back-to-back under a radome. Flight III DDG-51 destroyers are also planned to have the SPQ-9B.

Gallery

References

External links
 NAVAIR warfighters encyclopedia, AN/SPQ-9A
 Fire Controlman Volume 02-Fire Control Radar Fundamentals, via tpub
 GlobalSecurity.org AN/SPQ-9 Radar

Sea radars
Military radars of the United States
Northrop Grumman radars